Armitage with Handsacre is a civil parish in the district of Lichfield, Staffordshire, England.  It contains 19 buildings that are recorded in the National Heritage List for England.  Of these, one is listed at Grade II*, the middle of the three grades, and the others are at Grade II, the lowest grade.  The parish contains the villages of Armitage and Handsacre and the surrounding countryside.  Most of the listed buildings are houses and farmhouses, the earlier of which are timber framed.  The Trent and Mersey Canal passes through the parish, and two accommodation bridges crossing it are listed.  Hawkesyard Priory is in the parish, and its priory church is listed, together with nearby Spode House and associated structures, which have connections with the priory.  The other listed buildings are another church, a chapel, a churchyard cross, and a war memorial.


Key

Buildings

References

Citations

Sources

Lists of listed buildings in Staffordshire